Liolaemus aparicioi is a species of lizard in the family  Liolaemidae. It is native to Bolivia.

References

aparicioi
Reptiles described in 2012
Reptiles of Bolivia
Taxa named by Andrés Sebastián Quinteros